The Royal Architectural Institute of Canada (RAIC) is a not-for-profit, national organization that has represented architects and architecture for over 100 years, in existence since 1907. The RAIC is the leading voice for excellence in the built environment in Canada, demonstrating how design enhances the quality of life, while addressing important issues of society through responsible architecture. The RAIC’s mission is to promote excellence in the built environment and to advocate for responsible architecture. The organization national office is based in Ottawa with a growing federated chapter model. Current chapters and networks are based in British Columbia, Alberta and Nova Scotia.

History
RAIC was founded in 1907. It provided a country-level co-ordination among previously-existing provincial architectural groups. Through its journal, the organization provided information to its members about building practices and design considerations in Canada.

In 1948, in anticipation of the confederation of Newfoundland with Canada. Architects there formed the Newfoundland Architects Association, which became a chapter of the RAIC.

After World War II, the RAIC made considerable efforts to develop connections and forums for collaboration between architects and members of related professions, including interior design, arts and crafts. They also worked on developing standards of measurement in the building trades.

In 2000, a study of the organization's Journal showed that the publication had perpetuated gender-based stereotypes about the field of architecture.

In 2006, the RAIC signed on for the 2030 °Challenge, which urges the global architecture community to adopt targets to ensure building practices are carbon-neutral by 2030.

The RAIC presents an annual Conference on Architecture for architects and members to network, earn continuing education credits, and celebrate excellence in architecture. The RAIC also administers a job board and event board for members and the public.

Membership

There are three classes of membership in the RAIC: Members (post-nominal letters MRAIC), fellows (FRAIC), and honorary members/fellows (Hon. MRAIC/FRAIC).

Awards and honours sponsored by RAIC
RAIC Gold Medal - their highest honour.
Governor General's Medals in Architecture  (previously known as Massey Medals, administered by RAIC)
RAIC Student Medal
RAIC Architectural Firm Award
National Urban Design Awards
RAIC Emerging Architect Award (previously known as the RAIC Young Architect Award)
RAIC Prix du XXe siècle
RAIC Emerging Architectural Practice Award
RAIC Awards of Excellence
RAIC Foundation Scholarships & Bursaries

See also

List of Canadian organizations with royal patronage
Commonwealth Association of Architects

References

"Architecture in Canada" The Canadian Encyclopedia
Kalman, Harold D. A History of Canadian Architecture. Toronto: Oxford University Press, 1994.

External links
RAIC Official website
The 2030 Challenge

 
Architecture associations based in Canada
1907 establishments in Ontario
Architecture awards
Architecture in Canada
Architecture-related professional associations
Commonwealth Association of Architects
Organizations based in Canada with royal patronage
Organizations based in Ottawa
Organizations established in 1907